is a Japanese yo-yo competitor and performer. He is a four-time world champion. He has two world records in "The Most Eli Hops in 30 seconds" and “The fastest time to knock off a
coin from the ears of 15 participants with a loop-the-loop yoyo trick.”.

Megumi, his younger sister, has a world record in Guinness World Records for Most skips in 30 seconds.

Biography
When he was young, he also trained Skipping rope, but he quit because he could not beat his younger sister.

In 2001, Suzuki participated in his first World Yo-Yo Contest.  He used Mickey Mouse March for his performance, so he is sometimes called 'Mickey'.

He graduated Nishio High School in March 2008.

He was matriculated in Faculty of Communication Studies, Department of Language Communication of Aichi Shukutoku University in April 2008. It was changed to "Faculty of Global Culture and Communication" in 2010.

On March 13, 2011, he was awarded 2011 University President Award for great performance in contests and success in yo-yo business.

In March 2012, he graduated from Aichi Shukutoku University.

In August 2012, he won his 4th world title in the World Yo-Yo Contest in 1A.

Results

Awards
Bali International YoYo Open 2012 B.O.B.(Best Of Best) Division Champion (August 25, 2012)
Bali International YoYo Open 2011 B.O.B.(Best Of Best) Division Champion (July 9, 2011)
2011 University President Award (Aichi Shukutoku University, March 13, 2011)
Happy Yellow Puppy Commendation (Chūkyō Television Broadcasting, December 2009)

Guinness World Records
The Most Eli Hops in 30 seconds (December 19, 2009)
The fastest time to knock off a coin from the ears of 15 participants with a loop-the-loop yoyo trick (April 28, 2011)

References

External links
Hiroyuki Suzuki OFFICIAL WEBSITE -World YoYo Champion-

1989 births
Sportspeople from Aichi Prefecture
Sports world record holders
Yo-yo performers
Living people
Aichi Shukutoku University alumni